Norwegian County Road 456 (Fv456) is a Norwegian county road in Vest-Agder, Norway. The road takes over for European route E39 in Hannevika, Kristiansand, in to the borough Vågsbygd. Therefore this part is called the Vågsbygdporten and goes through a tunnel under Slettheia. The road continues south through Vågsbygd and goes west when it comes to Voiebyen. It then goes past Bråvann and into Søgne municipality. In Søgne, the road goes through Langenes and is therefore called Langenesveien or Langenessletta. County Road 456 goes past places like the church in Søgne and the only high school in Søgne. The road ends in Søgne centrum, Tangvall. It leads through the centre and stops with E39 again.

References

456